Barbara Blackman ( Patterson; born 22 December 1928) is an Australian writer, poet, librettist, broadcaster, model and patron of the arts.  In 2004, she donated $1 million to a number of Australian music organisations, including Pro Musica, the Australian Chamber Orchestra, the Australian National University's School of Music and the Stopera Chamber Opera Company. In 2006, she was awarded the Australian Contemporary Music Award for Patronage. Barbara Blackman was married for 27 years to renowned Australian artist Charles Blackman.

Biography

Early life 
Blackman Patterson was born in Brisbane, Queensland on 22 December 1928 with her twin sister, Coralie Hilda, who died 16 days later. Three years later her father, W.H. (Harry) Patterson, died and her mother, Gertrude Olson Patterson, was able to support them both by working as an accountant. She attended Brisbane State High School where she developed what was to be a lifelong love of music. She also developed an early interest in writing, and was a member, with Pamela Crawford, Judith Wright and Thea Astley, of the Barjai group of writers in Brisbane. She had poor eyesight from an early age and, at 22, was diagnosed with optic atrophy. Her vision deteriorated rapidly and she became completely blind.

Blackman became an artist's model who was in high demand by many leading modernist artists in Australia such as Clifton Pugh and Fred Williams, and appears in many of Charles Blackman's, works, including his Alice In Wonderland series of paintings.

Work and interests 
Blackman has lived a self-described unconventional life according to her autobiography. In a documentary film about her, Seeing From Within, released in 2017, Blackman states, "I could not have lived a conventional life, as I could not have picked up the rules".

She has exhibited a wide range of intellectual interests and abilities. For example, she wrote the libretto for Peter Sculthorpe's Eliza Surviva (an opera that was never completed because of difficulties between him and his collaborator, Patrick White)., an autobiography, and a humorous book of verse. Blackman's work is highly valued, as evidenced in the collection of correspondence between Blackman and her friend, the poet Judith Wright, published in 2007, and in the list of numerous resources written by her and about her that has been collected in the Australian Women's Register. Nevertheless, Blackman has maintained a humble attitude about her intellectual pursuits, saying, "I go with the angels and they know more than we do," she says. "I told them what I wanted and they showed me the way."

Marriage and children 
She married the Australian artist Charles Blackman in 1952 and they lived in Melbourne, supported by her income as an artist's model and from the blind pension and his earnings as a kitchen hand, most of which went to pay for costs associated with maintaining Charles' studio. They divorced in 1978 after Charles' alcoholism had escalated over their marriage of nearly 30 years, which she described as "one of the great marriages, which lasted as long as possible, and a bit longer".

Blackman had three children (Auguste and Christabel, both of whom became artists, and Barnaby) by Charles. She later married Marcel Veldhoven and moved with him to a retreat on the South Coast of NSW. When this relationship ended she moved to Canberra.

Recognition 
In 2012, Blackman was appointed Officer of the Order of Australia (AO) with the citation  "for distinguished service to the arts and to the community, as a supporter of artistic performance, through philanthropic contributions, and as an advocate for people who are blind and partially sighted."

Published works
 Certain Chairs, published by Viking Press
 Barbara and Charles Blackman Talk About Food (Taylor, John), published by Rigby, a division of Houghton Mifflin Harcourt
Glass after Glass : Autobiographical Reflections, Penguin Books/Viking, 1997 /
All My Januaries: Pleasures of Life and Other Essays, University of Queensland Press, 2016, 
 Portrait of a Friendship: The Letters of Barbara Blackman and Judith Wright (Bryony Cosgrove), published by The Miegunyah Press, a division of Melbourne University Press

References 

1928 births
Living people
Australian memoirists
20th-century Australian philanthropists
Australian blind people
Officers of the Order of Australia
21st-century Australian philanthropists